Kuchen is the German word for cake and is used in other languages as the name for several different types of sweet desserts, pastries, and gateaux.

Kuchen may also refer to:

 Audrey Kuchen, television news reporter
 Dick Kuchen, basketball coach
 Fritz Kuchen (1877–1973), sport shooter
 Kuchen, Baden-Württemberg

See also
 Backe, backe Kuchen, a children's rhyme